Kaleida may refer to the following:
Kaleida (band), an English music duo
Kaleida Health, a healthcare provider
Kaleida Labs, a multimedia company
Kaleida, Manitoba